The 2015 Hawaii Bowl was a post-season American college football bowl game played on December 24, 2015 at Aloha Stadium in Honolulu, Hawaii.  The fourteenth edition of the Hawaii Bowl featured the Cincinnati Bearcats of the American Athletic Conference against the San Diego State Aztecs from the Mountain West Conference.  It began at 3:15 p.m. HST and aired on ESPN.  It was one of the 2015–16 bowl games that concluded the 2015 FBS football season.

Teams
The game featured the Cincinnati Bearcats with a record of 7–5 against San Diego State which had a 9-game winning streak going into the game. The Aztecs defeated the Bearcats by a score of 42-7.

Cincinnati Bearcats

This was the Bearcats' 17th bowl game (they were 8–8 all-time in bowl games), their fifth consecutive bowl appearance, and their first bowl game in Hawaii.

San Diego State Aztecs

San Diego State, playing its sixth straight bowl game, had won all of its eight regular conference games this year. They then defeated Air Force, 27-24 in the title game for the school's 20th football conference championship. Head coach Rocky Long is among 13 active coaches to have guided his current team to a bowl game during his first five seasons as the head man. This was also the Aztecs' first bowl game in Hawaii since 1952.

Game summary

Scoring Summary

Source:

Statistics

References

Hawaii Bowl
Hawaii Bowl
Cincinnati Bearcats football bowl games
San Diego State Aztecs football bowl games
December 2015 sports events in the United States
Hawaii Bowl